Nagina is a town in Uttar Pradesh, India.

Nagina may also refer to:

 Nagina (Assembly constituency), Uttar Pradesh, India
 Nagina (Lok Sabha constituency), Uttar Pradesh, India
 Nagina (1951 film), a Hindi Bollywood film
 Nagina (1986 film), a Hindi film
 Nagina (2014 film), a Bhojpuri film
 Nagina (Jungle Books) or Nagaina, a fictional cobra
 Nagina Masjid (disambiguation), any of the several mosques in India

See also 
 Nagin (disambiguation)
 Nagini (disambiguation)